Zhu Wenquan (born October 1942) is a general (shangjiang) of the People's Liberation Army (PLA). He was an alternate member of the 16th Central Committee of the Chinese Communist Party. He was a delegate to the 9th National People's Congress and a member of the Standing Committee of the 11th National People's Congress.

Biography
Zhu was born in Xiangshui County, Jiangsu, in October 1942. He enlisted in the People's Liberation Army (PLA) in August 1961, and joined the Chinese Communist Party (CCP) in May 1964. In August 1982, he graduated from the PLA Military Academy. He served in the Jinan Military Region for a long time. In February 1994, he was transferred to the Nanjing Military Region and appointed commander of the 1st Group Army. From August to September 1998, he led soldiers to fight the floods in Jiujiang, Jiangxi and block the breach of the Yangtze River. He became chief of staff of the Nanjing Military Region in April 1999, and served until October 2002, when he was promoted to commander.

He was promoted to the rank of major general (shaojiang) in February 1994, lieutenant general (zhongjiang) in July 2000 and general (shangjiang) in June 2006.

Publication

References

1942 births
Living people
People from Xiangshui County
Central Party School of the Chinese Communist Party alumni
Commanders of the Nanjing Military Region
People's Liberation Army generals from Jiangsu
People's Republic of China politicians from Jiangsu
Chinese Communist Party politicians from Jiangsu
Alternate members of the 16th Central Committee of the Chinese Communist Party
Delegates to the 9th National People's Congress
Members of the Standing Committee of the 11th National People's Congress